The New Democratic Army – Kachin (abbreviated NDA-K) was an armed insurgent group that operated from 1989 until its conversion into a "border guard force" in November 2009.

History
The NDA-K was founded in 1989 by former Kachin Independence Organization (KIO) officers Zahkung Ting Ying (a.k.a. S'Khon Tein Yein), Layawk Zelum, and Ying Zelum, when they led a communist faction of 700 soldiers that split from the KIO due to its political differences. In the same year, the group agreed to a ceasefire with the government, and it de facto operated under the Tatmadaw's command as a "special regional task force".

The group received a budget, rations, and supplies from the government. Additionally, 600 soldiers were paid by the government as part of the Myanmar Police Force. In November 2009, the group became one of the first insurgent groups under a ceasefire agreement to convert into a "border guard force". Some members have since joined the Kachin State Progressive Party (KSPP) to contest in the 2010 general election.

Splinter group
A Rawang leader Lauban Tanggu Dang (Ah Dang; Burmese: တန်ဂူးတန်) established the Rebellion Resistance Force from the NDA-K group.

Leader
Zahkung Ting Ying is a Ngochang from the Yunnan Frontier. In 1968, he split from Kachin Independence Army and joined the Communist Party Burma and established the CPB's 101 War Zone with Zaluman, another KIA defector. In 2016, he was expelled from the Union Parliament for breaking a lot of election laws while campaigning.

Illegal rare-earth mining
It was reported that illegal rare earth mining has surged in NDA-K held areas near the Chinese border following the February 2021 coup. Environmental groups estimate that there are more than 100 rare earth mines in the area controlled by the militia, where Chinese investors was looking for the resource as Beijing cracked down on illegal mining within China.

See also
 Kachin Independence Organisation

References

Rebel groups in Myanmar
History of Myanmar (1948–present)
Paramilitary organisations based in Myanmar